Albert Lipscomb (born January 9, 1951) is an American politician in the American state of Alabama. He served in the Alabama State Senate from 1989 to 2002. Lipscomb currently is a member of the Board of Registrars of Baldwin County, Alabama.  He describes himself as a social and fiscal conservative.

References

1951 births
Living people
People from Fairhope, Alabama
University of Mobile alumni
Republican Party Alabama state senators